Schoolhouse No. 6 is a historic one room school building located at Guilderland in Albany County, New York.  It was built in 1860 and is a one-story cobblestone building built of coursed cobblestones with smooth ashlar quoins.  It features a curvilinear hipped roof topped by an open bell tower.  Also on the property is a contributing privy.

It was listed on the National Register of Historic Places in 1982.

References

External links
Cobblestone School House - history and photos

School buildings on the National Register of Historic Places in New York (state)
School buildings completed in 1860
Cobblestone architecture
Schools in Albany County, New York
National Register of Historic Places in Albany County, New York